Spring Friends Meeting House is a historic Quaker meeting house located at Snow Camp, Alamance County, North Carolina. The fourth and current meeting house was built in 1907, and is a small rectangular frame one-story gable-front building.  It features Gothic Revival style lancet windows and a short, plain rectangular cupola with pyramidal roof. Spring Friends Meeting is an active congregation of Quakers from the Alamance, Chatham, Orange, Guilford and Randolph County area of North Carolina.  Members of the Religious Society of Friends first started "meeting at the spring" around 1761, with the congregation formally recognized by North Carolina Yearly Meeting in 1773.  The adjacent contributing cemetery dates from the founding of the meeting, about 1761. It contains the graves of some of the earliest Quaker settlers in Alamance County, as well as the unmarked graves of
approximately 25 American Revolutionary War soldiers killed in the 1781 Battle of Lindley's Mill.  The battle itself was waged around the meeting house, with governor Thomas Burke and other officials held prisoner in the original meeting house during the battle.

It was added to the National Register of Historic Places in 1987.

References

Quaker meeting houses in North Carolina
Churches on the National Register of Historic Places in North Carolina
Cemeteries on the National Register of Historic Places in North Carolina
Churches completed in 1907
20th-century Quaker meeting houses
Churches in Alamance County, North Carolina
National Register of Historic Places in Alamance County, North Carolina